Dave  Welch is an English poker player based in St Albans, who made several appearances on the Late Night Poker television series, including the season 1 grand final and the season 6 semi-final.

His biggest cash win to date is FF 250,000 ($40,750) for winning the 1998 Euro Finals of Poker no limit hold'em poker tournament, defeating a field including Padraig Parkinson, Dave "Devilfish" Ulliott, Patrick Bruel and Surinder Sunar.

As of 2008, his total live tournament winnings exceed $360,000.

Welch is married to poker player Debbie Berlin, another Late Night Poker regular.

References

English poker players
Living people
Year of birth missing (living people)